Craig Arthur Doty (born August 27, 1985) is an American college men's basketball coach currently coaching at Emporia State University. Prior to his current position, Doty was the head coach for at Graceland University from 2016 to 2018, where he led the school to its first NAIA national championship, as well as a Heart of America Athletic Conference tournament championship. Doty was the men's basketball head coach at Rock Valley College from 2012 to 2016, where he won two NJCAA Division III championship.

Career

Early career 
Doty, an Alcester, South Dakota native, began his coaching career as a volunteer assistant for Morningside College, where he played on the men's basketball team from 2005 to 2009. After graduating with his master's degree, Doty moved to Wyoming to become the assistant coach for Central Wyoming College, where he would eventually serve as interim head coach for the remaining two months of the 2010–11 season. At the conclusion of the season, Doty left to become an assistant for Riverland Community College for half a season before leaving to become an assistant at the University of Sioux Falls for the remaining of the season.

Rock Valley College 
After serving three seasons as an assistant coach at four schools, Doty was named the head coach at Rock Valley College, a National Junior College Athletic Association Division III school, in 2012. During his four seasons, Doty led the Rock Valley to a record of  overall,  conference, ending his run with two NJCAA Division III national championships. Doty won his first national championship during his second season in 2013–14 with a record of 30–5, 10–5 conference. The following year, Doty led the Golden Eagles to national runners-up, and won a second national championship during the 2015–16 season.

Graceland University 
Following two national championships in four seasons, Doty was named the head coach for Graceland University in May 2016. During his two-year tenure at Graceland, Doty lead the Yellowjackets to a record of  overall,  conference, and ended his tenure with his third national championship – Graceland's first – during the 2017–18 season. Graceland won the 2018 Heart of America Athletic Conference Tournament.

Emporia State University 
In April 2018, Doty was named head coach for the Emporia State Hornets basketball team.

Head coach record

References

External links
 Emporia State profile
 Midwest Elite Basketball profile

1985 births
Living people
American men's basketball coaches
Basketball coaches from South Dakota
Basketball players from South Dakota
Emporia State Hornets basketball coaches
Graceland Yellowjackets men's basketball coaches
Guards (basketball)
Morningside Mustangs men's basketball players
People from Union County, South Dakota
Rock Valley Golden Eagles men's basketball coaches